Alex Kuznetsov and Mischa Zverev were the defending champions but lost to Alex Bogomolov Jr. and Jordan Kerr in the quarterfinals.
Top seeded Australians Samuel Groth and Chris Guccione won the title over wildcards Ryan Harrison and Mark Knowles.

Seeds

Draw

Draw

References
 Main Draw

Challenger of Dallas - Doubles
2014 Doubles